Darren Rameka is a New Zealand former professional rugby league footballer who played professionally in Australia.

Playing career
Rameka played for the New Zealand Māori in the 1994 Pacific Cup. He again played for the Māori in a 1999 match against the Great Britain Lions.

In 1995 Rameka made his professional debut, playing for the Sydney City Roosters. He played two seasons for the Roosters before moving to the St. George Dragons in 1997.

During the Super League war he represented the Australian Rugby League's Rest of the World side in 1997. He then spent the 1998 season with the Western Suburbs Magpies. He remained with Wests in 1999 but did not play a first grade match.

References

1973 births
Living people
New Zealand rugby league players
New Zealand Māori rugby league players
New Zealand Māori rugby league team players
Rugby league players from Wellington City
Rugby league props
Rugby league second-rows
Sydney Roosters players
St. George Dragons players
Western Suburbs Magpies players
Wellington rugby league team players